Vladimir Aïtoff (August 5, 1879 in Paris – Septempber 6, 1963 in Paris) was a French rugby union player who competed in the 1900 Summer Olympics. Aïtoff was a member of the French rugby union team, which won the gold medal. During World War I, Aïtoff was a doctor in the French Army, with him being awarded with the Croix de Guerre and the Légion d'honneur. In World War II, he was imprisoned in both the Buchenwald and Auschwitz concentration camps.

Biography
Aïtoff was the son of Russian revolutionary emigrant and Freemason, David Alexandrovich Aitov (1854-1933).

References

External links

profile

1879 births
1963 deaths
Rugby union players from Paris
French rugby union players
Rugby union players at the 1900 Summer Olympics
Olympic rugby union players of France
Olympic gold medalists for France
French people of Russian descent
Buchenwald concentration camp survivors
Medalists at the 1900 Summer Olympics